Katghar Railway Station is located in Moradabad city of Uttar Pradesh. It lies on Lucknow–Moradabad line. It is about 5 km from Moradabad railway station which is the major railway station nearby to it.

See also
 Moradabad railway station

Railway stations in Moradabad district